Mouth Dreams is the fourth mashup album by American musician and comedian Neil Cicierega. It was released on September 30, 2020. Like his three previous mashup albums (Mouth Sounds, Mouth Silence, and Mouth Moods), its source material is primarily Top 40 hits from the late 20th and early 21st centuries, but this time with an emphasis on songs about sleeping and dreams. It marks the musician's first major album release since 2017.

Background
 
Like his previous mashup albums Mouth Sounds, Mouth Silence, and Mouth Moods, its source material is primarily Top 40 hits from the late 20th and early 21st centuries; he also sampled classical music from the 19th century ("Brithoven" and "Ain't"). However, unlike previous albums, Cicierega uses samples from a wider variety of time periods, such as pre-1960s pop music including Dean Martin's "That's Amore" (1953) in "Aammoorree" and Raymond Scott's "Powerhouse"  (1937) in "Whitehouse;" and where Smash Mouth is usually featured either directly or indirectly with   the previous albums (hence the "Mouth" series), Smash Mouth's "All Star" is only featured in one song: "Mouth Dreams (Extro)".

Like in Mouth Silence, there is a secret message hidden in the track info for Mouth Dreams. Each track contains a one-letter comment; when the tracks are arranged in reverse alphabetical order by title, the comments spell "I can't think of a secret message."

In addition, the album's cover art hides several secrets. Two Wingding characters are hidden within each of Cicierega's pupils when the image is brightened; these wingdings stand for the English letters "M" and "D", referring to the album's title "Mouth Dreams." Ewoks can be faintly seen reflected in Cicierega's glasses, referencing the track "Limp Wicket" featuring samples from Meco's "Ewok Celebration." The letters that feature sparkles beside them in Cicierega's name and in the title spell out, in order, "NiCe MoDems", referencing the final track of the album, "Ain't", which concludes with a clip of a dial-up modem. The album art's colors when inverted feature the similar colors used in Mouth Moods.

Reception 
Critical reception of Mouth Dreams was positive. Joseph Earp of Junkee called it Cicierega's "new masterpiece",  "his wildest work yet" and "heinous and beautiful in the same measure". The A.V. Club praised it as "so stupid, and so good".

Track listing

References

External links

Mouth Dreams on Internet Archive

2020 mixtape albums
2020 remix albums
Mashup albums
Neil Cicierega remix albums